John Lawrence LeConte (May 13, 1825 – November 15, 1883) was an American entomologist of the 19th century, responsible for naming and describing approximately half of the insect taxa known in the United States during his lifetime, including some 5,000 species of beetles. He was recognized as the foremost authority on North American beetles during his lifetime, and has been described as "the father of American beetle study".

Early life
A member of the scientifically inclined LeConte family, John Lawrence was born in New York City, the son of naturalist John Eatton Le Conte. His mother died when John Lawrence was only a few months old, and he was raised by his father. Most reliable sources spell his name "LeConte" or "Leconte", without the space used by his father, and samples of his signature show the preference for "LeConte". He graduated from Mount Saint Mary College, Emmettsburg, Maryland, in 1842, and from the College of Physicians and Surgeons, New York, in 1846. While still in medical college, in 1844, John Lawrence traveled with his cousin Joseph LeConte to the Great Lakes. Starting at Niagara Falls, they visited Detroit and Chicago and traversed Michigan, Wisconsin, Iowa and Illinois before returning up the Ohio River to Pittsburgh and on to New York. John Lawrence published his first three papers on beetles that year.

Having inherited enough money to make him independent, LeConte did not practice medicine professionally.

Travels
After graduating from medical college John Lawrence LeConte made several trips west, including to California via Panama in 1849. While in San Francisco, he sent 10,000 beetles preserved in alcohol back to his father. Another 20,000 beetle specimens were lost in a fire in 1852. LeConte also traveled to Europe, Egypt and Algiers. He spent two years exploring the Colorado River, and was in Honduras for the building of the Honduras Interoceanic Railway, and in Colorado and New Mexico with the party surveying for the Kansas Pacific Railroad. He moved to Philadelphia in 1852, residing there for the rest of his life. He died in Philadelphia on November 15, 1883.

Military service
During the American Civil War he served as a surgeon with the California Volunteers, reaching the rank of lieutenant colonel.

U.S. Mint
In 1878 he became the chief clerk (assistant director) of the United States Mint in Philadelphia. He retained that position until his death in 1883.

Scientific societies
LeConte was active in the scientific societies of his time, with stints as vice-president of the American Philosophical Society (1880–1883) and president of the American Association for the Advancement of Science (1873). He was a founder of the American Entomological Society, and a charter member of the National Academy of Sciences.

Legacy

The genera Lecontella, Lecontellus, Lecontia, and Contia and several hundred species (mostly beetles) are named after him, including a bird, LeConte's thrasher (Toxostoma lecontei), which he discovered while on a beetle-collecting trip to Arizona, and was named after him by George Newbold Lawrence. LeConte communicated with and collected birds and other natural history specimens for Spencer Fullerton Baird, a distant cousin and assistant director and then director of the Smithsonian Institution for a total of 39 years. In turn Baird asked other naturalists to collect beetles for LeConte.

In the 1850s, LeConte collected some crystals from a cave in Honduras being mined for bat guano.  It was later found to be a new mineral that was named "lecontite" in his honor.

Works

 
Catalogue of the Coleoptera of the United States. (1853) Frederick Ernst Melsheimer, revised by Samuel Stehman Haldeman and John Lawrence LeConte
Classification of the Coleoptera of North America (1861, 1873)
New Species of North American Coleoptera (1866, 1873)
 
Classification of the Coleoptera of North America. Part II (1883) - with George Henry Horn

Notes

References

"John Lawrence LeConte" (1936). Dictionary of American Biography, Charles Scribner's Sons.

External links

Samuel Henshaw (1878) The entomological writings of John L. Leconte.:Dimmock's special bibliography. no. 1 Cambridge, Massachusetts, The editor (George Dimmock), 1878.

1825 births
1883 deaths
American entomologists
Coleopterists
Union Army surgeons
Members of the United States National Academy of Sciences
Scientists from New York City
19th-century American people
Mount St. Mary's University alumni
Burials at West Laurel Hill Cemetery
Members of the American Philosophical Society